Diacylglycerol diphosphate phosphatase (DGPP phosphatase, DGPP phosphohydrolase, DPP1, DPPL1, DPPL2, PAP2, pyrophosphate phosphatase) is an enzyme with systematic name 1,2-diacyl-sn-glycerol 3-phosphate phosphohydrolase. This enzyme catalyses the following chemical reaction

 1,2-diacyl-sn-glycerol 3-diphosphate + H2O  1,2-diacyl-sn-glycerol 3-phosphate + phosphate

The phosphatase activity of this enzyme is Mg2+-independent.

References

External links 
 

EC 3.1.3